The Monster of Florence is the name commonly used by the Italian media for an unidentified serial killer active within the Province of Florence between 1968 and 1985. The Monster murdered fourteen victims, usually young couples secluded in search of intimacy, in wooded areas during new moons.

Law enforcement conducted several investigations into the cases over the course of several years. In 2000, courts convicted two individuals for four of the double homicides. They had been charged with being part of an alleged group of murderers who became known as the "Snacks companions" (Compagni di merende). Multiple weapons were used in the murders, including a .22 caliber Beretta handgun and a knife, and in half of the cases sex organs were excised from the bodies of the female victims, the removal of which appeared to be the motive for the crimes.

Murders

Lo Bianco and Locci 
On the night of 21 August 1968, mason worker Antonio Lo Bianco (29) and homemaker Barbara Locci (32) were shot to death with a .22 handgun in Signa, a small town to the west of Florence. The couple were attacked in their car while Locci's son, Natalino Mele (6), lay asleep in the backseat. Upon waking up and finding his mother dead, the child fled in fright and reached a house two kilometres away.

Locci, a native of Sardinia, had been well-known in the town for her sexual promiscuity, receiving the nickname ape regina ("Queen Bee"). Her older husband, Stefano Mele, was eventually charged with the murder and spent six years in prison. However, while he was imprisoned, another couple was murdered apparently with the same gun. Several lovers of Locci's were suspected to be perpetrators of the crime and even Stefano stated on several occasions that one of them had killed her, but no evidence was found as other murders were committed while they were in prison.

In 1982, the murders of Lo Bianco and Locci were linked to the more recent murders based on a tip from an anonymous writer who had possibly signed himself Un cittadino amico ("a friendly citizen") in a letter to police. On 20 July 1982, examining magistrate Vincenzo Tricomi found five bullets and five shell casings inappropriately stored in a folder among records of Mele's case file. Authorities were unable to reconstruct the chain of custody of those pieces of evidence and did not request a scientific comparison, even though it would have been necessary to check whether they matched the ballistic report from 1968. As the spent cartridges were fired by a gun used in four similar crimes, their presence in the Mele's case file suggested to law enforcement officers that the perpetrator of the more recent double murders was connected with them.

Gentilcore and Pettini 
On 15 September 1974, teenaged sweethearts Pasquale Gentilcore (19), a barman, and Stefania Pettini (18), an accountant, were shot and stabbed in a country lane near Borgo San Lorenzo while having sex in Gentilcore's Fiat 127. They were not far from a notorious discothèque called Teen Club, where they were supposed to spend the evening with friends. Pettini's corpse had been violated with a grapevine stalk and disfigured with 97 stab wounds. 

Some hours before the murder, Pettini had disclosed to a close friend that a weird man was terrifying her. Another friend of Pettini's recalled that a strange man had followed and bothered the two of them during a driving lesson a few days before. Several couples of lovers who used to "park" in the same area where Gentilcore and Pettini were murdered stated that particular area was frequented by voyeurs, a pair of them acting very oddly.

Foggi and De Nuccio 
On 6 June 1981, warehouseman Giovanni Foggi (30) and shop assistant Carmela De Nuccio (21) were shot and stabbed near Scandicci, where the engaged couple both lived. De Nuccio's body was pulled out of the car and the killer cut out her pubic area with a notched knife. The next morning, a young voyeur, paramedic Enzo Spalletti (30), spoke about the murder before the corpses had been discovered. He spent three months in jail and was charged with murder before the perpetrator exonerated him by killing again.

Baldi and Campi 
On 23 October 1981, workman Stefano Baldi (26) and telephonist Susanna Cambi (24), who were engaged, were shot and stabbed in a park in the vicinity of Calenzano. Cambi's pubic area was cut out like De Nuccio's. An anonymous caller phoned Cambi's mother the morning after the murder to "talk to her about her daughter." A few days before the murder, Susanna had told her mother that there was somebody tormenting her and even chasing her by car.

Mainardi and Migliorini 
On 19 June 1982, mechanic Paolo Mainardi (22) and dressmaker Antonella Migliorini (20) were shot to death just after having sex in Mainardi's car on a provincial road in Montespertoli. This time the killer did not have the time to mutilate the female victim as the road was relatively busy and several passing motorists had seen the car parked at the side of the road after its interior light had turned on. Mainardi was still alive when found, but died some hours later in hospital due to serious injuries. 

Mainardi is believed to have heard or seen the killer approaching and attempted to drive away, only to lose control of his car and drive into a ditch on the other side of the road. Another reconstruction of the events suggests that, after shooting the couple, the killer drove Mainardi's car for a few meters to hide the vehicle and the bodies in a woodland area nearby, only to lose control of the car and abandon it in the ditch where it was discovered by a motorist only a few minutes later.

Meyer and Rüsch 
On 9 September 1983, Wilhelm Friedrich Horst Meyer (24) and Jens Uwe Rüsch (24), two students from Osnabrück, West Germany, were visiting Italy to celebrate an important scholarship Meyer had just won. They were found shot to death in their Volkswagen Samba Bus in Galluzzo. Rüsch's long blond hair and small build could have deceived the killer into thinking he was a female. Police suspected that the students were gay lovers based on pornographic materials found at the scene.

Stefanacci and Rontini 
On 29 July 1984, law student Claudio Stefanacci (21) and barmaid Pia Gilda Rontini (18) were shot and stabbed in Stefanacci's Fiat Panda parked in a woodland area near Vicchio. The killer removed Rontini's pubic area and left breast. There were reports of a strange man who had been following the couple in an ice cream parlour some hours before the murder. A close friend of Rontini recalled that she had confided that she had been bothered by "an unpleasant man" while working at the bar.

Kraveichvili and Mauriot 
On the night of 7–8 September 1985, Jean Michel Kraveichvili (25), a musician of Georgian ancestry, and tradeswoman Nadine Mauriot (36), both from Audincourt, France, were shot and stabbed while sleeping in their small tent in a woodland area near San Casciano. Kraveichvili was killed a short distance away from the tent while trying to escape. Mauriot's body was mutilated. Because the killer had murdered two foreigners, there was not yet a missing persons report. The killer sent a taunting note, along with a piece of Mauriot's breast, to the state prosecutor, Silvia Della Monica, stating that a murder had taken place and challenging local authorities to find the victims. A person picking mushrooms in the area discovered the bodies a few hours before the letter arrived on Della Monica's desk.

Suspects and reaction 
It was not until the Foggi-De Nuccio murders in 1981 that the police realised the killings were connected. A newspaper article about the Gentilcore-Pettini murder from 1974 caused the police to perform a ballistics test and confirm the same gun had been used in both murders. Reporter Mario Spezi coined the moniker "Monster of Florence". 

After the 1982 murders, police leaked false information that Mainardi had regained consciousness before dying in the hospital. Soon after, an anonymous tip called for the police to relook at the Lo Bianco-Locci murder from 1968; it was quickly determined that the same gun had been used. The confession and conviction of Locci's husband, Stefano Mele, was subsequently revisited, as Mele had been imprisoned during the later murders. Mele's statements in police interviews were inconsistent, shifting the blame among his Sardinian relatives and acquaintances. Francesco Vinci was arrested first. He was a former lover of Locci's whose car had been found hidden on the day the false Mainardi information had been leaked. Francesco was kept in custody for over a year, even during the 1983 murders. Examining magistrate Mario Rotella instead widened the net, arresting Mele's brother and brother-in-law, Giovanni Mele and Piero Mucciarini. The 1984 murders occurred when the three suspects were in custody, so the police released them. Rotella focused on Francesco's brother Salvatore Vinci, himself another lover and former lodger of Barbara Locci's. Vinci's first wife had died in a fire in Sardinia, ruled a suicide although rumored to be a murder. After the final Monster murder in 1985, Rotella arrested Vinci and charged him with the murder of his wife, intending to move from there to the other killings attributed to the Monster. The trial in Sardinia instead acquitted Vinci, who walked free. By this point, chief prosecutor Pier Luigi Vigna thought the Sardinian trail spent, and wanted to look into the possibility of the gun having been picked up by an unknown party after its use in the 1968 murder. In 1989, Rotella was forced to officially clear all the Sardinian suspects and withdraw from the case.

With the use of computer analysis and anonymous tips, a new suspect, Pietro Pacciani, was found. Pacciani had been convicted both for rape and domestic abuse of his two daughters, and for the 1951 murder of a man who had relations with his ex-girlfriend, for which he served thirteen years in prison. Inspector Ruggero Perugini found incriminating evidence, such as similarities between the 1951 murder and the Monster killings, as well as a reproduction of Primavera by Botticelli and another painting thought to be by Pacciani. The only physical evidence against Pacciani was an unfired bullet of the same brand as the Monster's, found in Pacciani's garden at the end of a lengthy search.

Pacciani was controversially convicted in his initial trial in 1994. At his appeal, the prosecutor took Pacciani's side, citing lack of evidence and poor police work. As a result, Pacciani was acquitted and released in 1996. Perugini's successor Michele Giuttari tried to introduce new witnesses at the final hour, but was denied. A new trial for Pacciani was ordered by the Supreme Court, but he died in 1998 before it could begin. Instead, two alleged accomplices were tried, Mario Vanni and Giancarlo Lotti. Vanni had been a witness at Pacciani's trial, where he famously claimed the two of them merely to be "Picnic Companions" (Compagni di Merende), a term that entered Italian vernaculum. Lotti had been one of Giuttari's surprise witnesses, claiming to have seen Pacciani and Vanni commit the 1985 murder. After many more sessions of questioning, he had begun to incriminate himself in the murders as well. Both were convicted and condemned to life imprisonment, though their sentences have been widely criticized and many consider the murders to be unsolved.

In 2001, Giuttari, now chief inspector for the police unit GIDES (Gruppo Investigativo Delitti Seriali, Investigative Group for Serial Crimes), announced that the crimes were connected to a satanic cult allegedly active in the Florence area. In his testimony, Lotti had spoken of a doctor who had hired Pacciani to commit the murders and collect the genitalia of the women for use in rituals. Giuttari justified this partly on the discovery of a pyramidal stone near a villa where Pacciani had been employed. The stone, Giuttari suggested, was indicative of cult activity. Critics, such as Spezi, found this idea laughable, given that such stones are commonly used as doorstops in the surrounding area. The villa was searched, but nothing was found.

Giuttari, the chief prosecutor of Perugia Giuliano Mignini and Gabriella Carlizzi, editor-in-chief of the magazine L'Altra Repubblica, speculated that a pharmacist, Francesco Calamandrei, and a deceased physician from Perugia, Francesco Narducci, had been involved in the secret society ordering Pacciani and the others. Calamandrei was put on trial while Narducci's body was exhumed. In the end, Calamandrei was completely exonerated and nothing incriminating was found regarding Narducci. During the process, journalist Mario Spezi was arrested by Mignini. Spezi had been investigating his own favored suspect, a son of Salvatore Vinci. Mignini claimed he did so to obstruct the investigation into Calamandrei and Narducci's sect, to which he claimed Spezi belonged. After international outcry, Spezi was set free, his arrest declared illegal. Giuttari and Mignini were indicted for abuse of office. GIDES was dissolved, and no active investigation of the Monster of Florence remains.

In 2017, Francesco Amicone, a freelance journalist, conducted an investigation on his own that would lead him to find a connection between the Monster of Florence and the Zodiac Killer cases. Amicone's inquiry has been published in Italian magazine Tempi and newspapers Il Giornale and Libero. The suspect is a former superintendent of the Florence American Cemetery in Italy, Joseph aka Giuseppe Bevilacqua, also known as Giuseppe, who was born on 20 December 1935, in Totowa, New Jersey, and had a 20-years career in the Army when he left it to move to Florence in 1974. Amicone wrote an account of a Bevilacqua's partial admission, in which he would have confessed to Amicone being responsible of the murders attributed to the Zodiac killer and the Monster of Florence in an unregistered conversation occurred on 11 September 2017. After the first publication in May 2018, Bevilacqua denied this; even though threatened with a lawsuit, Amicone did not stop accusing him. In 2021, Amicone claimed that Bevilacqua would have been an undercover CID agent assigned to an investigation in San Francisco concerning SMA William O. Wooldridge and other Army sergeants at the time of Zodiac's homicides in 1969 and 1970. Whilst an Army criminal investigator in Italy in the early 1970s, Amicone says that Bevilacqua would have had access to a case file of a double murder near Florence in 1968 where bullets and shell casings had been improperly stored., and that Bevilacqua replaced the pieces of evidence with spent cartridges shot by the gun he would use in the Monster's homicides in order to link his future crimes to those murders for which he had an alibi. Italian authorities collected Bevilacqua's DNA in late 2020.

In 2021, at the request of the Attorney in charge of the investigation on the Monster, Pm Luca Turco, the investigations into Bevilacqua resulting from Amicone's inquiry were closed. In justifying his request, the prosecutor affirmed that "this journalistic inquiry is characterized by suggestions, assumptions, asserted intuitions, and it does not contain any factual element likely to rise to the dignity of a clue". Amicone has been investigated for defamation due to a complaint from Bevilacqua.

Books, film and television 
 The Monster of Florence, a 1983 non-fiction book by Mario Spezi. A 1986 Italian film of the same name written and directed by Cesare Ferrario, and co-written by Fulvio Ricciardi.
 The Monster of Florence: A True Story, a 2008 true crime book by Douglas Preston and Mario Spezi based on the case. 
 Il mostro di Firenze, a 1986 film based on the case.
 L'assassino è ancora tra noi (The Murderer Is Still Free Among Us), an Italian giallo loosely based on the case, was filmed soon after one of the murders and also released in 1986. It was written and directed by Camillo Teti, and co-written by Giuliano Carnimeo and Ernesto Gastaldi.
 Paolo Frajoli and Gianni Siragusa's 28° minuto (1991) is a drama starring Corinne Cléry and Christian Borromeo inspired by the case.
 The 1996 book The Monster Of Florence by Magdalen Nabb doubted Pacciani as Il Mostro and was based on actual and extensive case documents, including the criminal profile report commissioned from the Behavioral Science Unit in Quantico, Virginia. Although the book is a work of fiction, Nabb states that the investigation in the novel was real and the presentation as fiction was a protective measure.
 The 1999 novel Hannibal, the 2001 film adaptation, and the television adaption have all used the Il Mostro case as the basis for a sub-plot of the scenes set in Florence. Thomas Harris visited Florence and attended Pacciani's trial while researching the book. In the novel, supporting antagonist Inspector Rinaldo Pazzi (based on Ruggero Perugini) was professionally disgraced when he arrested the wrong man for the Il Mostro murders. In scenes that were cut from the film before its release, a janitor at the Palazzo Vecchio, who witnesses Hannibal Lecter (Anthony Hopkins) murdering Chief Inspector Rinaldo Pazzi (Giancarlo Giannini) before fleeing the city, is revealed to be Il Mostro. Although the sub-plot involving Il Mostro was removed entirely from the completed film, the deleted scenes are included as an extra feature on the DVD. In the third season of the television series, it is implied that Hannibal himself (Mads Mikkelsen) was Il Mostro.
 The 2006 book Dolci colline di sangue(Sweet hills of blood) by Douglas Preston and Mario Spezi casts doubts on the culpability of Pacciani as Il Mostro. Writer/producer Christopher McQuarrie purchased the screen rights to the book.
 The 2008 book The Monster of Florence: A True Story by Douglas Preston and Mario Spezi is the english translation of the 2006 Italian language book 'Dolci colline di sangue' with some revision and additions, casts doubts on the culpability of Pacciani as Il Mostro. Writer/producer Christopher McQuarrie purchased the screen rights to the book.
 In 2009, a six-part television film, Il mostro di Firenze, was produced and broadcast by Fox Crime.
 The 2011 e-book The True Stories of the Monster Of Florence by Jacopo Pezzan and Giacomo Brunoro (April 2011) gives a detailed account of all the murders and the different investigative theories.
 The 2012 book Delitto degli Scopeti – Giustizia mancata (The Scopeti Crime – Failed Justice), written by lawyer Vieri Adriani, Francesco Cappeletti, and Salvatore Maugeri, reanalyzes and reconstructs the final pair of murders, which took place in the town of Scopeti, of French tourists Kraviechvili and Mauriot. The book claims to expose missteps and procedural errors in the investigation.
 In "Il Mostro", the second episode of Season 2 of the television series Criminal Minds: Beyond Borders, the Monster of Florence is identified as a surgeon (played by Paul Sorvino). Suspected of being the Monster after the murders, he left Florence and continued to kill elsewhere in Europe, and in Asia. Now terminally ill, he returns to Florence and manipulates his son (played by Luca Malacrino), the product of an incestuous rape between the Monster and his own sister, into becoming a copycat killer.

See also 
 Zodiac killer
 List of fugitives from justice who disappeared

References

External links 

 "Monster of Florence", a detailed account of all the facts and theories behind the case at Florence Web Guide
 "Italy: The Monster of Florence", a report by John Moody for Time
 "The Monster of Florence", a shorter account on Douglas Preston's narrative by The Atlantic
 "The Monster of Florence", a map of the murders on Google Maps
 "The Monster of Florence", part eight of a 2004 interview with author Magdalen Nabb detailing her research on the case and Mario Spezi

1968 murders in Italy
1974 murders in Italy
1981 murders in Italy
1982 murders in Italy
1983 murders in Italy
1984 murders in Italy
1985 murders in Italy
20th century in Tuscany
Crime in Tuscany
Fugitives wanted by Italy
History of Florence
Italian serial killers
Overturned convictions in Italy
Unidentified serial killers